The Malton Mirror is a free monthly community newspaper serving the Malton neighbourhood of Mississauga, Ontario, Canada.

History
The Mississauga News published a three-part opinion piece, starting May 28, 2008, titled "A World of Hurt". Critical of the community's direction in the last 20 years, it highlighted the crime in the area, speculating that it might come from its isolation, dubbing the area "Mississauga's Alaska".

A few Malton residents, politicians (Ward 5 City Councillor Eve Adams, MPP Dr. Kuldip Singh Kular, and MP Gurbax Singh Malhi) and community organizations like Malton Neighbourhood Services came together to publish the Malton Mirror, the first issue released in September/October 2009. The entire paper was volunteer created, funded by advertising, and distributed for free in Malton, at Mississauga City Hall, and the security office at the Brampton Civic Centre. The Lincoln Media Group, a club at Lincoln M. Alexander Secondary School, contributed a section to each issue. The Malton Mirror is currently in its third year and going strong.

References

Mass media in Mississauga
Publications established in 2009
2009 establishments in Ontario